Walckenaeria acuminata is a spider species found in Europe and the Caucasus.

See also 
 List of Linyphiidae species

References

External links 

Linyphiidae
Spiders of Europe
Spiders described in 1833